The Omsukchan Range is a mountain range in the Magadan Oblast, Far Eastern Federal District, Russia. The nearest city is Omsukchan, the capital of Omsukchan District, and the nearest airport Omsukchan Airport.

A branch of the Kolyma Highway, the Omsukchan Highway, passes through the middle section of the ridge, across the Kapranovsky Pass. The mountains have rich deposits of tin, gold and silver. Ken Mountain, a conical peak which is a tourist attraction, is located in the range.

Geography
The Omsukchan Range rises in the southernmost sector of the Kolyma Highlands System. The range runs between the Balygychan River 
valley in the west and the Sugoy River valley in the east, both right tributaries of the Kolyma. This peak is also the highest of the Kolyma Highlands. The highest point in Magadan Oblast, however, is the highest peak of the Okhandya Range.     

The right tributaries of the Balygychan River, such as the Kirchan, Dzhagin, Bulur and Nyagain, as well as all the left tributaries of the Sugoy, such as the Marat and the Volna, have their sources in the range. 

The relief of the northern section of the range is characterized by smooth slopes and rounded tops. The highest peaks are found in the south, where the shape of the range becomes clearly alpine with sharp and craggy peaks and ridges, as well as steep scree slopes.

Flora
The slopes of the range are mostly bare and have a barren look. There are poplar forests in the valleys.

See also
Dukat, Russia, a mining town in the range

References

External links

Kolyma - Tourism
Mountain ranges of Magadan Oblast
Kolyma Mountains
Tourist attractions in Magadan Oblast